DR1 (DR Et) is the flagship television channel of the Danish Broadcasting Corporation (DR). It became Denmark's first television station when it began broadcasting in 1951 – at first only for an hour a day three times a week.

Besides its own productions, the channel also broadcasts co-productions with other Nordic countries through Nordvision, as well as a significant amount of programmes from English-speaking countries like the United States, United Kingdom, and Australia, all in the original language with Danish subtitles. Its news programme is called TV Avisen.

Broadcasting hours 
1951–1966: 10 hours a week (5 programs)
1966–1982: 14 hours a day (35 programs a week)
1982–1995: 18 hours a day (50 programs a week)
1995–2000: 21 hours a day (60 programs a week)
2000-today: 24 hours a day

Technological advances

Colour TV 
Colour television test broadcasts were started in March 1967, with the first large-scale colour broadcasting occurring for the 1968 Winter Olympics in Grenoble, France. DR officially ended "test" transmissions of colour television on April 1, 1970, although it wasn't until 1978 that their last black-and-white television program (TV Avisen) switched to colour.

Teletext 
On exactly 16 May 1983 at 14:00 CEST, DR launched its first teletext information service, which is still available on all DR channels.

Widescreen TV 
In 2004 DR announced future plans for a complete switch from a 4:3 screen ratio to 16:9 widescreen broadcasts. The switch took place in 2006 when DR moved its production facilities from TV-Byen to DR Byen in Copenhagen. The last of DR1's own productions to switch to widescreen was the daily news programme (TV Avisen) in November 2006.

Digital TV 
At midnight on November 1, 2009 the analogue broadcasts shut down nationwide and DR switched to digital broadcasting.

High-definition 
In January 2012, DR1 switched from 576i SD to 720p HD broadcasting.

HbbTV 
In April 2014, DR launched its HbbTV service on DR1, enabling on-demand streaming of DR content directly on an internet-connected television.

Logos and identities

Original Programming on DR1

Drama 
 Better Times
 Borgen
 Follow the Money
 Huset på Christianshavn
 Matador
 Sommer
 Taxa
 The Bridge
 The Eagle
 The Kingdom
 The Killing
 The Legacy
 The Protectors
 Nikolaj og Julie
 Rejseholdet

News and society 
TV Avisen
Magasinet Penge
Horisont
Bag om Borgen
Aftenshowet
Kontant
Rabatten

Entertainment 
6200 Aabenraa
Bonderøven - Moved from DR2 following the success of the show.
By på Skrump
 Dansk Melodi Grand Prix (The Danish national selection for Eurovision Song Contest)
 Det Nye Talkshow
 Eurovision Song Contest 1964, Eurovision Song Contest 2001 and Eurovision Song Contest 2014.
 - Moved from DR3 following the success of the show. Remade in other countries as Married at First Sight.
Gør det selv
Ha' det godt
Hammerslag
Hvad er det værd?
Klimaduks og Blærerøv
Søren Ryge

DR productions based on other formats 
X Factor (Denmark)

Children's entertainment 
Disney Sjov (Disney Cartoons)
Barda
Morgenhår
Isas Stepz
Min Funky Familie
MGP
MGP Nordic (together with SVT, NRK and YLE)

Other DR productions 
DR Kirken
Før Søndagen
Sporløs

Imported programming on DR1 
As is the practice with most channels in Denmark, foreign TV programmes are shown in their original language but with Danish subtitles.

bro'Town
BlackJack
Columbo
Conviction
Dawson's Creek
Doctor Who
Downton Abbey
Endeavour
Family Guy
Foyle's War
From All of Us to All of You
Homeland
Lewis
Little House on the Prairie
Merlin
Midsomer Murders
Planet Earth
Seinfeld
Small Claims
Sugar Rush
Taggart
The Last Enemy

References

External links 

Television stations in Denmark
Television channels and stations established in 1951
1951 establishments in Denmark